Plenty is a 1985 drama film directed by Fred Schepisi and starring Meryl Streep. It was adapted from David Hare's play of the same name.

Spanning nearly 20 years from the early 1940s to the 1960s, the plot focuses on Susan Traherne, an Englishwoman who is irreparably changed by her experiences as a fighter for the French Resistance during World War II when she has a one-night stand with a British intelligence agent. After the war ends, Susan returns to England and becomes determined to make a life for herself by achieving what she wishes in the post-war world which, after her time away, she finds trivial and inadequate, while acting with complete disregard for everybody around her.

Plot

In 1943, in German-occupied France during World War II, 18-year-old British courier Susan Traherne (Meryl Streep) waits in the woods for a message to be dropped by parachute from a British plane. After experiencing airplane trouble, a fellow British operative named Lazar (Sam Neill) parachutes down, and Susan explains how things are run at her post. When they are nearly caught by German troops, Susan's tough exterior cracks, and she cries on Lazar's shoulder. Soon after, the couple returns to Susan's home and make love. Lazar leaves the next morning, without saying goodbye to Susan. However, he leaves behind his cuff-links for her as a gift which Susan then carries around with her for the remainder of the film.

Two years later after the war ends in 1945, while travelling through Europe with Susan, a man named Tony Radley drops dead of a heart attack in a hotel lobby in Brussels. Raymond Brock (Charles Dance) from the British Embassy arrives to oversee Radley's funeral, and consoles his widow, Susan. Sometime later at the embassy, Susan confesses to Raymond that she and Radley were not really married; they only posed as husband and wife during the war, and asks him to tell Radley's real wife that the man died while traveling alone.

After returning to London for the first time in two years, Susan and Raymond begin a relationship, and he travels from his post in Belgium to visit her in England every weekend. Susan takes a job as a clerk in a small shipping firm in the East End. Susan's friend and colleague, the spunky 18-year-old Alice Park (Tracey Ullman), moves in with her, and they engage in a bohemian lifestyle, visiting nightclubs together. Susan is restless in her post-war life, and expresses frustration with her job at the shipping office. During the winter of 1945-1946, she quarrels with Raymond, and suggests they separate for the winter.

Skipping forward to 1953, Susan is now working as a member of Queen Elizabeth's coronation committee. She has moved into a larger apartment, and Alice is still her roommate. One day, Susan asks one of Alice's former boyfriends and a fellow working-class lover, Mick (Sting), to father her child. He reluctantly agrees to conceive a child with her, but is discouraged that she would want to raise the baby without him.

When her job in the coronation committee is done, Susan begins working in advertising, but leaves within months, finding the work unsatisfying. Over time, Mick tries to court Susan, but she refuses to consider having a real relationship with him. After 18 months of trying and failing to become pregnant, Susan ends their involvement which leads to a confrontation on New Year's Day in 1955 between her and Mick in her apartment which ends with Susan firing a gun above Mick's head to make him leave. Alice telephones Susan's former boyfriend, Raymond (who is still working in the diplomatic corps), to report that Susan has suffered a nervous breakdown. He arrives to visit her in the hospital, and in time, Raymond and Susan get married.

In a jump-forward to November 1956, Susan remains frustrated with her life despite that she is married and now living with Raymond in a smart house in the affluent West End. Susan's unstable mental state becomes apparent to everyone, including Alice, when Susan is moody and is insulting to Raymond and their friends during a dinner party attended by Raymond's employer Sir Leonard Darwin (John Gielgud). This prompts Darwin to needlessly humiliate Mme. Aung (Pik-Sen Lim), the wife of an Asian diplomat named Mr. Aung (Burt Kwouk), and then walks out of the party. Raymond then announces to everyone that Darwin is going to resign from his position due to Great Britain's disastrous involvement in the Suez Crisis.

Skipping forward three or four years later, Susan and Raymond have moved to Jordan, where Raymond has been assigned a diplomatic post. Alice pays them a visit, and is alarmed by Susan's subdued demeanor. Although Susan claims to be happy, Alice questions her and Raymond about their sedate lifestyle, and worries how her friend could stay in Jordan for another two years. When word travels of the death of Raymond's colleague, Sir Leonard Darwin, Susan uses the excuse to return to England for the funeral, and Raymond blames Alice for putting the idea in Susan's head. Back in England, Susan insists they not return to Jordan.

Sometime later in 1962, Susan meets Raymond's employer and Darwin's replacement, Sir Andrew Charleson (Ian McKellen), and questions him about her husband's stagnant career, which she correctly interprets as a censure for his abandonment of the post in Jordan. This fact is subtly confirmed by Charleson. The meeting soon turns ugly when Susan threatens to commit suicide if Raymond does not receive a promotion within six days, which prompts Charleson to have Susan removed from the building. Raymond is immediately summoned to Charleson's office, who informs him of his wife's visit and threats, at the conclusion of which he is dismissed entirely from the Diplomatic Service and forced into early retirement.

When the distraught and sombre Raymond returns home, he finds Susan decorating the house, seemingly oblivious to her actions earlier that day. Raymond insists Susan see a mental health practitioner, but she refuses and claims to have no idea what he means by that. As the couple argue, Susan slams a door in his face, and Raymond is knocked unconscious. She nurses his bloodied face before packing her things and leaving.

Soon after, Susan rekindles her wartime love affair with Lazar, meeting him at a seaside hotel, after he had tracked her down after seeing her being interviewed on a TV program weeks earlier about her involvement in the war. After they make love, Susan shares her mental instability with Lazar. When she falls asleep, he leaves.

In the final scene, Susan recalls her idealistic youth in the French countryside, following the end of the war where news about Germany's surrender reaches the French village where Susan is staying. Susan talks with a local French dairy farmer about the end of the war and agrees to accompany him to a party with his family in the village to celebrate the end of the conflict. In the ironic final shot, Susan proclaims: "there will be days and days like this for many years to come!"

Cast
 Meryl Streep as Susan Traherne
 Charles Dance as Raymond Brock
 Tracey Ullman as Alice Park
 John Gielgud as Sir Leonard Darwin
 Sting as Mick
 Ian McKellen as Sir Andrew Charleson
 Sam Neill as Lazar
 Burt Kwouk as Mr Aung
 Pik-Sen Lim as Mme Aung

Reception

Critical response
Plenty was met with mixed reviews upon release. It holds a 56% rating on Rotten Tomatoes from 16 critics.

Movie critic Roger Ebert gave the film three-and-a-half stars out of four. He said that Streep gave "a performance of great subtlety; it is hard to play an unbalanced, neurotic, self-destructive woman, and do it with such gentleness and charm... Streep creates a whole character around a woman who could have simply been a catalogue of symptoms.". Cultural and literary critic Tiffany Gilbert suggests that the "Englishness" that scriptwriter David Hare regarded as an essential theme of the  movie was inescapably diminished by the casting of Hollywood star Meryl Streep as Susan: "[…] it inevitably loses some of its political edge[…] in ceding to the Hollywood fame machine." (albeit it had been a Canadian actor, Kate Nelligan, who had originally taken the part on the London and New York stages). Nelligan had played the part as a strong and capable woman, whereas Streep's depiction of neurosis transformed the play into a typical "Hollywood product".

Awards
Ullman and Gielgud were nominated for BAFTA Awards and Gielgud was named Best Supporting Actor by both the Los Angeles Film Critics Association and the National Society of Film Critics.

Novel
A tie-in-novel by Andrew Osmond built on the movie's popularity with a pulp account of the post-war life of Lazar, Susan's lover.

References

External links
 
 

1985 films
1985 drama films
Films shot at EMI-Elstree Studios
British films based on plays
Films directed by Fred Schepisi
Films scored by Bruce Smeaton
Films shot in Belgium
Plays by David Hare
American drama films
British drama films
Films set in the 1940s
Films set in the 1950s
Films set in the 1960s
RKO Pictures films
Films about the French Resistance
British World War II films
American World War II films
Suez Crisis films
Films set in 1943
Films set in 1945
Films set in 1953
Films set in 1956
Films set in Brussels
Films set in London
Films set in 1962
1980s English-language films
1980s American films
1980s British films